June Banerjee is an Indian and Bengali singer who has sung in the films like Khokababu, Lorai etc.  She was the singer of the popular Bengali song Soniye Tu Janiye Tu, Laila Laila. June started her singing career by singing ad jingles. Later she got her first break in the film Chirodini Tumi Je Amar (2008).

Bengali Playback songs

Hindi Playback songs

See also
Chirodini Tumi Je Amar
Khokababu

References

External links

June Banerjee singer

Year of birth missing (living people)
Living people
Bengali singers
University of Calcutta alumni
Women musicians from West Bengal